Towamba is a small community, in New South Wales, Australia in Bega Valley Shire. It is located about forty minutes' drive west of Eden.

Along with settlements such as Burragate, Pericoe, Rocky Hall and Kiah, Towamba was one of the settlements established after Benjamin Boyd began to open up the area to European settlement in the 1840s and 1850s.

This small community has had a public school since 1862 located in Towamba Street. The original ford crossing the Towamba River was opposite the old Police Station, now a private dwelling. The first bridge built across the river was swept away in the 1919 floods where every bridge on the river was swept away.

The Towamba River
Like many river systems throughout the Australian outback, the Towamba River is prone to extremes. When it floods it completely cuts off the village of Towamba from the outside world.

Towamba remains a small service centre for the neighbouring agricultural community.

Towamba Hall is a mud brick building located in the isolated rural community of Towamba. This venue can cater for a whole range of events with the Towamba oval right next door.

Towamba also has its own radio station run by local volunteers.

Notes and references

Towns in the South Coast (New South Wales)
Bega Valley Shire